GSC 02620-00648 is a double star in the constellation Hercules. The brighter of the pair is a magnitude 12 star located approximately 1,660 light-years away. This star is about 1.18 times as massive as the Sun.

Planetary system
In 2006 the TrES program discovered exoplanet TrES-4 using the transit method. This planet orbits the primary star.

Binary star
In 2008 a study was undertaken of 14 stars with exoplanets that were originally discovered using the transit method through relatively small telescopes. These systems were re-examined with the 2.2M reflector telescope at the Calar Alto Observatory in Spain. This star system, along with two others, was determined to be a previously unknown binary star system. The previously unknown secondary star is a dim magnitude 14 K or M-type star separated by about 755 AU from the primary, appearing offset from the primary by about one arc second in the images. This discovery resulted in a recalculation of parameters for both the planet and the primary star.

See also
 Trans-Atlantic Exoplanet Survey
 List of extrasolar planets

Notes
 Note b: The secondary star is identified with a "C" suffix so as to not confuse it with the planetary designation suffix "b".

References

External links
 
 

Hercules (constellation)
Planetary transit variables
Planetary systems with one confirmed planet
Binary stars
F-type stars
2